Ismail Ibrahim (4 August 1932 – 15 June 2020) was a Pakistani cricketer. He played in eight first-class matches for Karachi from 1954/55 to 1957/58.

References

External links
 

1932 births
2020 deaths
Pakistani cricketers
Karachi cricketers
Karachi Blues cricketers
People from Junagadh district